An emergency Airworthiness Directive (EAD) is an airworthiness directive issued when an unsafe condition exists that requires immediate action by an aircraft owner or operator. EADs are published by a responsible authorities such as FOCA, EASA or FAA related to airworthiness and maintenance of aircraft and aircraft parts. It contains measures which must be accomplished and the related periods to preserve their airworthiness. Technical information is addressed to operators and maintenance organisations of affected aircraft only. EADs become effective upon receipt of notification.

Notable incidents that have led to emergency airworthiness directives

 On May 25, 1979, American Airlines Flight 191, a McDonnell Douglas DC-10 crashed after takeoff from Chicago O'Hare Airport. An engine separated from the plane, damaging electrical and hydraulic systems, causing the left wing's slats to retract and stall that wing. This led to the type being grounded in June 1979.
On August 20, 2007, China Airlines Flight 120, a Boeing 737-800 inbound from Taipei, caught fire shortly after landing at Naha Airport in Okinawa Prefecture, Japan. There were no fatalities. Following this incident, the FAA issued an Emergency Airworthiness Directive on August 25 ordering inspection of all Boeing 737NG series aircraft for loose components in the wing leading edge slats within 24 days.
 On October 7, 2008, Qantas Flight 72, a scheduled flight from Singapore Changi Airport to Perth Airport, made an emergency landing at Learmonth airport near the town of Exmouth, Western Australia following a pair of sudden uncommanded pitch-down manoeuvres that resulted in serious injuries to many of the occupants. The aircraft was equipped with a Northrop Grumman made ADIRS, which investigators sent to the manufacturer in the US for further testing. On 15 January 2009 the EASA issued an Emergency Airworthiness Directive to address the above A330 and A340 Northrop-Grumman ADIRU problem of incorrectly responding to a defective inertial reference.

 On January 16, 2013 the FAA issued an emergency airworthiness directive ordering all U.S. airlines to ground the Boeing 787s in their fleets due to problems with the aircraft's lithium-ion battery.  The directive came after the second incident of battery fire aboard the aircraft. This was the first time that the FAA had issued a general grounding of an aircraft model since 1979's DC-10 grounding.
On November 7, 2018, nine days after the crash of Lion Air flight JT610 which killed all 189 people on board, the Federal Aviation Administration issued an emergency airworthiness directive concerning a possible problem with the AoA (Angle of Attack) display of the Boeing 737 MAX 8 and MAX 9 aircraft types.

References

External links
 FAA
 FOCA
 EASA

Aviation licenses and certifications
Aviation safety
Aircraft maintenance